Maksym Ihorovych Voytikhovskyi (born 7 January 1999) is a Ukrainian professional footballer who plays as a centre-back for Ukrainian club Chornomorets Odesa.

References

External links

 
 Profile on Volyn Lutsk official website
 

1999 births
Living people
Sportspeople from Ternopil
Ukrainian footballers
Association football defenders
FC Dnipro players
FC Chornomorets Odesa players
FC Chornomorets-2 Odesa players
FC Shakhtar Donetsk players
FC Volyn Lutsk players
Ukrainian Premier League players
Ukrainian First League players
Ukrainian Second League players
Ukraine youth international footballers